Convoy ON 154 - also ON(S) 154 or ONS 154 - was a North Atlantic convoy of the ON series which ran during the battle of the Atlantic in World War II. It was the 154th of the numbered series of  merchant ship convoys Outbound from the British Isles to North America. It came under attack in December 1942 and lost 13 of its 50 freighters. One of the attacking U-boats was destroyed.

Background
As western Atlantic coastal convoys brought an end to the second happy time, Admiral Karl Dönitz, the Befehlshaber der U-Boote (BdU) or commander in chief of U-boats, shifted focus to the mid-Atlantic to avoid aircraft patrols. Although convoy routing was less predictable in the mid-ocean, Dönitz anticipated that the increased numbers of U-boats being produced would be able to effectively search for convoys with the advantage of intelligence gained through B-Dienst decryption of British Naval Cypher Number 3. However, only 20 percent of the 180 trans-Atlantic convoys sailing from the end of July 1942 until the end of April 1943 lost ships to U-boat attack.

Forces involved
The ships departed Liverpool on 18 December 1942 and comprised 50 merchant ships, in ballast or carrying trade goods. It was led by convoy commodore VAdm. W de M Egerton in Empire Shackleton.
The convoy sailed in twelve columns of three or four ships each.
ON 154 was a slow convoy, made up of ships that could manage 8 knots at best. Slow convoys were particularly vulnerable, as their top speed was matched by the submerged speed of the U-boats, and was just half their surface speed, thus making it easier for a wolfpack to form. 

ON 154’s ocean escort was the Royal Canadian Navy Mid-Ocean Escort Force Group C-1, led by  Lt. Cdr. Guy Windeyer in the River-class destroyer . C-1 was missing the Town-class destroyer Burwell, which had mechanical problems and was not replaced. RCN ships generally suffered from overwork compared to their Royal Navy equivalents, and were more likely to be un-modernized.
ON 154 included the convoy rescue ship Toward, the oiler Scottish Heather and the French-crewed 2,456-ton special service vessel . Fidelity was armed with four  guns, four torpedo tubes and a defensive torpedo net. She carried two landing craft (LCV-752 and LCV-754), two OS2U Kingfisher floatplanes and the Motor Torpedo Boat MTB 105.

Opposing ON 154 in the North Atlantic were the U-boat groups Ungestum (13 boats) and Spitz (11 boats) on patrol in the notorious Air Gap, where Allied air cover was unable to reach. A third group, Falke, acted as back-stop, but became involved with convoy HX 219 and had no effect on the fight for ON 154.

Action

Discovery on 26/27 December
ON 154 was routed south to avoid storms and remained distant from escort support groups and out of range of Allied patrol bombers for longer than most convoys.  reported the convoy on 26 December.  That night  torpedoed the leading ships from two of the starboard columns. Empire Union was hit at 01:40, Melrose Abbey was hit ten minutes later. Both British freighters sank at about 02:30. Toward rescued 63 survivors from the first ship and 47 from the second.

In a second attack, U-356 torpedoed the Dutch freighter Soekaboemi at 04:10, and the British freighter King Edward at 04:15. King Edward sank within three minutes. U-356 was detected by the escorts and was sunk with no survivors following depth charge attacks by St. Laurent, Chilliwack, Battleford and Napanee. At dawn, Toward rescued 25 men from the King Edward and assisted Napanee, recovering all but one of Soekaboemis crew. Soekaboemi remained afloat when abandoned at 07:30.

Second attack on 27/28 December
 began stalking Scottish Heather as she refuelled some of the escorts fifteen miles astern of the convoy on the afternoon of 27 December. U-225 was twice driven off by Chilliwack before hitting the oiler with a single torpedo in a third approach at 20:40. The ship was temporarily abandoned, but the second mate re-boarded her with ten men and sailed the ship out of the danger zone. At dawn he returned and pattern-searched for lifeboats. The oiler returned to England independently after recovering all of her crew.

Main attack on 28/29 December
 began shadowing the convoy on the morning of 28 December and directed 18 U-boats to the convoy. Fidelity attempted to launch a Kingfisher, but the plane capsized and sank at 19:15. While St. Laurent rescued the Kingfisher crew, a coordinated night attack began with U-boats entering the starboard side of the convoy at 19:58.  torpedoed the Norwegian freighter Norse King at 20:00. U-225 torpedoed the British freighters Melmore Head at 20:03 and Ville de Rouen at 20:05. U-260 torpedoed the British freighter Empire Wagtail at 20:45. As Empire Wagtail disintegrated in an explosion that claimed all of her crew, Fidelity reported a main engine failure; Shediac was sent to assist her  astern of the convoy.

U-boats then entered the port side of the convoy.  torpedoed the British freighters Lynton Grange at 21:20, Zarian at 21:23, and Baron Cochrane at 21:24.  hit the damaged Ville de Rouen again at 22:10 and U-225 torpedoed the convoy commodore's freighter Empire Shackleton at 22:15 and the Belgian freighter President Francoui at 22:30.

Disabled ships were also being attacked astern of the convoy. The crews had abandoned both ships when they were hit earlier. U-123 and  sank Empire Shackleton at 22:55.  sank the abandoned Zarian just before midnight.

Shediac was ordered to leave Fidelity  astern and rejoin the convoy while searching for survivors. Shediac rescued 35 survivors from Melmore Head and 71 from Ville de Rouen between 03:10 and 03:30 and 24 from Empire Shackleton at 05:30. Shediac rejoined the convoy at 13:00 short of fuel and with inadequate provisions for the number of survivors aboard.

Two lifeboats abandoned the damaged President Francoui, but the remainder of the crew attempted to sail independently to the Azores. The damaged Norse King was similarly attempting to reach the Azores when she was sunk by U-435 at 15:07. There were no survivors.

HMS Fidelity 29/30 December
Fidelity restarted main engines at 05:00 and declined the offer to dispatch a tug from Gibraltar. Speed was limited to two knots while streaming anti-torpedo nets when observed by Meteor and Milne at 05:30.  found Fidelity while her main engines were again stopped for repairs between 10:15 and 11:00. U-615 identified Fidelity as a Q-ship and shadowed her cautiously. A reconnaissance flight by Fidelitys remaining Kingfisher observed two shadowing submarines and two of Empire Shackletons lifeboats. Fidelity launched LCV-752 and LCV-754 to tow-in the lifeboats. Fidelity recovered the Kingfisher and the two landing craft with Empire Shackletons survivors that afternoon and launched MTB-105 to conduct anti-submarine patrols through the night. U-615 launched four torpedoes at Fidelity at about 20:00, but the anti-torpedo net protected the ship from damage. MTB-105 experienced engine problems and lost contact with Fidelity at about 23:00. MTB-105 heard radio calls from Fidelity shortly after dawn, but had inadequate battery power to respond. U-435 torpedoed Fidelity at 16:30 and was surprised by the size of the resulting explosion and by the large number of men subsequently seen floating in the water where the ship had sunk. MTB-105 rigged a makeshift sail to try and reach land. Fidelity had on board 369 people (274 crew, 51 Marines and 44 survivors from Empire Shackleton), all were lost at sea, including the convoy commodore of ON 154 Vice Admiral Wion de Malpas Egerton.

Survivors 30 December
On 30 December British destroyer Fame arrived, her skipper Cdr. R Heathcote (who was SOE of B-6 Escort Group) taking over as Senior Officer; at this point Windeyer, St. Laurents captain, collapsed from stress and  exhaustion.
Battleford, Shediac, Milne and Meteor were released on 30 December to refuel in the Azores. leaving only four escorts remaining and as many as twelve U-boats in contact with the convoy. Following the loss of the convoy commodore, the two fast ships with large passenger complements (Calgary and Advastun), were invited to escape if they found an opportunity. When  and the V-class destroyer HMS Viceroy reinforced the convoy escort before nightfall on 30 December, the U-boats were ordered to disengage.

Shediac and Meteor ran out of fuel before reaching the Azores. Battleford towed Shediac the last  and Meteor was towed the last . All four refuelled and joined the search for survivors. HMCS Prescott found and rescued the eight men aboard MTB-105 on 1 January; but, aside from the two-man Kingfisher crew rescued earlier by St. Laurent, there were no other survivors from Fidelitys crew of 325 and the men rescued from Empire Shackleton. Prescott also saved 26 crewmen from President Francoui, but the recovery effort found no other convoy survivors. The remainder of the convoy reached New York City on 12 January 1943.

Analysis
ON 154 lost 14 ships of 69,378 GRT and 486 men killed. It ranked as one of the half-dozen worst North Atlantic convoy disasters of the war. The Admiralty was critical of the Canadians for the outcome of this voyage, comparing it unfavourably with the transit of ON 155 escorted by B-6 escort group without loss. However both Blair and Milner point out that the Admiralty also bore responsibility for routing the convoy so far south, through the widest part of the Air Gap, with a five day transit  without air cover. C-1 was also  expected to operate with a destroyer short, with inadequate provision for re-fueling and with without modern equipment, against a pack that outnumbered it by four to one. Milner also points out that B-6 had been given a more northerly course, and a faster convoy, and that the RCN groups had  generally been assigned to the more vulnerable slow convoys of the SC and ON(S) series, while the RN groups had the faster HX and ON convoys.
Analysis of the convoy’s losses also shows that of the fourteen ships sunk, nine were lost outside the convoy, having been damaged or disabled in a previous attack and forced to drop out. After the first attack by U-356 just five U-boats (U-225, U-406, U-591, U-260 and U-123) had succeeded in penetrating the escort screen, while the rest of the pack had been driven off, and had picked off the stragglers.
Blair also points out that the German success against ON 154 was an exception; in December the Allies ran 16 trans-Atlantic convoys, containing some 650 ships; only three of them were attacked, and sank only 20 ships (ie. apart from the fourteen in ON 154, only two from HX 217 and four from ON 153), plus seven other ships sailing independently.

Conclusion
The attack on ON 154 was undoubtedly a success for the Germans, but the safe arrival of over two-thirds of the convoy’s ships, coupled with the destruction of one of the attackers, whilst being outnumbered by nearly four to one, was not a complete failure by the escort forces. However the Admiralty took the drastic decision to withdraw the RCN escort groups from the Atlantic, sending them for intensive training at the RN facilities at Liverpool and Tobermory. However they also set about  refitting of Canadian escort ships with modern equipment, a tacit acceptance of the RCN's complaints.
Meanwhile the burden of escorting slow convoys on the Atlantic route fell to the RN, leading to experiences not dissimilar to those suffered by the RCN up to then during the campaign.

Ships in the convoy

See also
 Convoy Battles of World War II

Notes

Bibliography
 Blair, Clay (1998) Hitler's U-Boat War [Volume 2]: The Hunted 1942–1945 Cassell  (2000 UK paperback ed.)
 
 
 
 Milner, Marc (2003) Battle of the Atlantic History Press 
 
 
 
 Gordon Mumford's account of Convoy ONS 154

ON154
Naval battles of World War II involving Canada
C